Rupali Bhosale is an Indian television actress known for playing Sanjana in Star Pravah's show Aai Kuthe Kay Karte and Varsha Ghotala in Sony SAB's Badi Doooor Se Aaye Hai. She was a contestant in the reality show Bigg Boss Marathi 2 in 2019.

Career
Bhosale started her career with Marathi shows like Man Udhan Varyache, Don Kinaare Doghi Apan and Kanyadaan. She later made her Bollywood debut with the film Risk in 2007.

Personal life 
Her Father's name is Prakash Bhosale. She was married to Milind Shinde but later they divorced in 2012. Currently, she is in a relationship with Aniket Magare.

Filmography

Television

Web series

See also 
List of Indian television actresses

References

External links 

Indian television actresses
Living people
Actresses in Marathi television
Actresses in Hindi television
21st-century Indian actresses
Bigg Boss Marathi contestants
1983 births